Pollenia similis is a species of cluster fly in the family Polleniidae.

Distribution
Austria, Albania, Czech Republic, Germany, Hungary, Poland, Romania, Slovakia, Ukraine.

References

Polleniidae
Insects described in 1941
Diptera of Europe